Actuate UK is an alliance of eight specialist engineering membership associations in the United Kingdom. It was formally launched in February 2021, in some respects superseding, but expanding on the activities of, the Specialist Engineering Contractors' Group which operated between 1993 and January 2021.

History
The SEC Group represented seven organisations which collectively comprised over 60,000 companies with a total workforce of over 300,000 individuals. It was particularly active in the areas of achieving: more cost effective procurement; fair and prompt payment and protection of cash retentions; supporting excellence and innovation and the early involvement of specialist contractors in construction projects, to ensure more effective delivery. 

After leading the SEC Group for more than 30 years, chief executive Rudi Klein retired in January 2021, and the SEC Group came to a close early in 2021.  

Actuate UK, the new engineering services sector alliance, has a wider focus, including commercial issues, sustainability (notably low to no carbon solutions), skills and building safety. It launched on 10 February 2021.

Members
Building Engineering Services Association
Building Services Research and Industry Association
Chartered Institution of Building Services Engineers
Electrical Contractors' Association
Federation of Environmental Trade Associations
Lift and Escalator Industry Association
SELECT - the Electrical Contractors' Association for Scotland
Scottish and Northern Ireland Plumbing Employers' Federation

References

External links
 Actuate UK website

Construction trade groups based in the United Kingdom
Engineering organizations
Organizations established in 1993